The Greater Binghamton Sports Complex was an air-supported dome in Union, New York. The complex was located on Airport Road off Route 17 near the city of Binghamton, New York. The purpose of the structure was to house its full size soccer field. The complex contained two offices and a cafe with seating area. The skylight measuring 197’ 6” x 30’  allowed natural light to enter the complex. The facility could house multiple sporting events at once and offered sports such as soccer, rugby union, lacrosse, baseball, and softball. The complex was also the 2009 home of the Binghamton Tiger Cats, a Women's Tackle Football team. By playing in the Complex the Tiger Cats became the first team to play indoors in the history of Women's Professional Football. The complex was engineered by Yeadon Corporation and was inflated in under two weeks.

Collapse 
In December 2020 the dome collapsed uncontrolledly during a record breaking snowstorm where 41 inches (104.14 centimeters) of snow fell in less than 24 hours. The owners have planned to rebuild the structure.

References

Further reading 
 http://www.yeadondomes.com/sub/newsletters/newsletters_03_2006.htm
 http://www.wbng.com/video/4857036.html
 http://greaterbinghamtonsportscomplex.com/

Sports venues in New York (state)
Covered stadiums in the United States
Sports venues in Broome County, New York
American football venues in New York (state)
Indoor soccer venues in New York (state)
National Premier Soccer League stadiums
Indoor lacrosse venues in the United States
Rugby union stadiums in New York (state)
Baseball venues in New York (state)
Softball venues in New York (state)
Soccer venues in New York (state)
Lacrosse venues in New York (state)